Alnwick Urban District was an urban district in Northumberland, England, based on Alnwick. It was created in 1894 and abolished in 1974 when it was replaced by  Alnwick District.

References

External links
 Alnwick UD archives at The National Archives

Urban districts of England
Former non-metropolitan districts of Northumberland
Districts of England abolished by the Local Government Act 1972
Districts of England created by the Local Government Act 1894